Abram Mikhailovich Dragomirov (tr. ; 9 December 1955) was a General in the Imperial Russian Army. Following the Russian Revolution he joined Anton Denikin in the Volunteer Army.

Youth 

He was the son of Russian General Mikhail Dragomirov and brother of Vladimir Dragomirov.

In 1902–1903, he was chief of staff of the 7th Cavalry Division, and later of the 10th Cavalry Division. In 1912 he became commander of the Kaunas Fortress.

First World War 

He started the War at the head of the 2nd Cavalry brigade and in December 1914 became as a General head of the 16th Cavalry Division. He led the 9th Army Corps in 1915–1916, the 5th Army between August 1916 and April 1917 and the Northern Front until June 1917.

Russian Civil War and exile 
According to Peter Kenez, "Before coming to the Kuban, General Dragomirov had been working with Shulgin in various anti-Bolshevik activities in Kiev." He became the third most powerful man in the Volunteer Army after Denikin and Mikhail Alekseyev.  In October 1918, he became the chairman of the Special Council.

After the defeat of the White Army, he was evacuated to Constantinople. He moved to Serbia and in 1931 to France.

Dragomirov joined Andrey Vlasov's pro-German Russian Liberation Army during World War II.

He lived the last 10 years of his life in France and was buried in the Sainte-Geneviève-des-Bois Russian Cemetery.

References

1868 births
1955 deaths
People from Chernigov Governorate
Russian military personnel of World War I
People of the Russian Civil War
Imperial Russian Army generals
Russian Liberation Army personnel
White movement generals
Russian anti-communists
Burials at Sainte-Geneviève-des-Bois Russian Cemetery
Emigrants from the Russian Empire to France
White Russian emigrants to France
Russian untitled nobility